"Superman" is a song by American rapper Eminem from his fourth studio album, The Eminem Show (2002), featuring guest vocals from Eminem's frequent collaborator, singer Dina Rae. Written by Eminem, Jeff Bass and Steve King, the song was released as the third single from The Eminem Show on January 14, 2003 in the United States only. It peaked at number 15 on the Billboard Hot 100 chart on the issue dated March 15, 2003 and received a Platinum certification by the Recording Industry Association of America (RIAA).

Background
"Superman" is about the rocky relationships and promiscuous nature of the girls Eminem has had in his life and how he plans to deal with it. In his 2008 autobiography, The Way I Am, Eminem revealed that the song is, to an extent, about his alleged relationship with American singer Mariah Carey. "Superman" is very similar to Eminem's song "Drug Ballad" and D12's song "Pimp Like Me".

In a 2021 interview with Raaj Bundles of SideShowRaaj, Dina Rae would reveal that Carey sung the original hook for "Superman" before being replaced with herself, due to personal conflicts between Eminem and Carey.

Critical reception
Entertainment Weekly editor described "In the creepy-crawly, mesmerizing 'Superman', he depicts himself as both sexual predator and commitment-phobic single guy." HipHopDX named the production "the southern bounce", lyrics as dealing with groupies and called the chorus "cheesy". Steve Juon described: "'Superman' features Eminem playing with his flow in a stuttered cadence, but he's done the gimmick before and his beat on this one inspires only partial attention to his flow." Rolling Stone concluded that his divorce fuels the slow Southern bounce of the hypermisogynist "Superman".

Music video
The accompanying music video for "Superman" features pornographic actress Gina Lynn. Shannon Elizabeth was Eminem's first choice, although this never came to fruition as they could not come to terms. The video can only be found on the 8 Mile DVD and contains an edit different from the album version. The uncensored video contains nudity and is rarely shown on MTV or BET, although it is available on YouTube, Vevo, and Dailymotion

Track listing and formats
Promotional CD single

12-inch vinyl single

Notes
  signifies an additional producer.

Charts

Weekly charts

Year-end charts

Certifications

Release history

References

External links
 

2002 singles
Songs written by Eminem
Song recordings produced by Eminem
Shady Records singles
Aftermath Entertainment singles
Interscope Records singles
Music videos directed by Paul Hunter (director)
Dirty rap songs
Eminem songs
Songs written by Jeff Bass